1895 was the sixth season of County Championship cricket in England. It was the first season in which the official definition of first-class cricket was activated, following the 1894 ruling. Surrey won the championship for the fifth time in six years, despite increased competition, as the tournament was expanded from nine to fourteen teams. The points system was changed as the teams played differing numbers of matches and the new system involved division of the number of points gained by the number of matches that had ended in either a win or a loss. Draws were thus completely disregarded, as they gave zero points. Derbyshire was the best of the rookie teams, finishing in fifth place.

Another championship made its bow as this season was the first to stage the Minor Counties Championship. The inaugural title was shared by three teams: Durham, Norfolk and Worcestershire.

In the early part of the season, improved batting conditions and long spells of dry weather enabled much heavier scoring than in previous seasons. There were a number of very large scores up until mid-July, when Archie MacLaren played his famous innings of 424 for Lancashire against Somerset at Taunton. After that, rain returned and most pitches from 20 July onwards were "sticky wickets", with the result that bowlers dominated the latter part of the season. Charlie Townsend in particular was able to generate prodigious spin of the ball on these treacherous pitches and took 122 wickets in the last 11 county games. Other established bowlers like Peel, Richardson, Mold and Briggs were very difficult to bat against.

At the age of 46 (when the season began), W. G. Grace enjoyed a remarkable career revival and was the leading run-scorer in all first-class matches, averaging over 50. He became the first player ever to score 1,000 runs during the month of May and also the first to reach the career landmark of one hundred first-class centuries.

Honours

County Championship - Surrey
Minor Counties Championship - Durham, Norfolk, Worcestershire (shared title)
Wisden - WG Grace

County Championship

Final table 

 1 Games completed

Points system:

 1 for a win
 0 for a draw, a tie or an abandoned match
 -1 for a loss

Most runs in the County Championship

Most wickets in the County Championship

Overall first-class statistics

Leading batsmen

Leading bowlers

References

Annual reviews
 James Lillywhite's Cricketers' Annual (Red Lilly), Lillywhite, 1896
 Wisden Cricketers' Almanack 1896

External links
 Cricket in England in 1895

1895 in English cricket
1895